Matt Hubbard is an American television writer and screenwriter who has worked on many television shows.  He graduated from Beverly High School, in Beverly, Massachusetts in the class of 1996, where he excelled in the English Department. He later went on to attend Harvard University where he was an editor for the Harvard Lampoon. He has worked as a writer on the NBC comedy series 30 Rock. He won Emmy awards in 2009 for both Outstanding Writing for a Comedy Series, for his 30 Rock episode "Reunion," and for Outstanding Comedy Series. He worked as a Consulting Producer and writer on the last two seasons of Parks and Recreation.

Filmography

Television

References

External links

American television writers
American male television writers
Living people
The Harvard Lampoon alumni
Writers Guild of America Award winners
Place of birth missing (living people)
Year of birth missing (living people)
Primetime Emmy Award winners
People from Beverly, Massachusetts
Screenwriters from Massachusetts
Beverly High School alumni